Beanstalk Bunny is a 1955 Warner Bros. Merrie Melodies cartoon directed by Chuck Jones. The short was released on 12 February 1955, and stars Bugs Bunny, Daffy Duck and Elmer Fudd. The cartoon's story is derived from the fairy tale "Jack and the Beanstalk".

Plot
Daffy Duck opens the story in the role of Jack summing up recent events:
Frustrated with having traded his cow for the three beans, Daffy tosses them away and they land in Bugs Bunny's rabbit hole. A beanstalk erupts shortly after, and Daffy decides to climb it for the sake of the cartoon ("Well, I'd better get to work climbing that thing, or we won't have any picture"). On the way up, he comes across Bugs, who is asleep in his bed which is stuck in the beanstalk.  Bugs awakens and sees Daffy, but Daffy kicks him away. Realizing which story is unfolding before him, Bugs decides that there will be a rabbit in this version of it and begins climbing after Daffy.

Meanwhile, Daffy reaches the top of the beanstalk, excited about stealing the fortune that the giant's castle holds, until he meets the giant himself – Elmer Fudd. Daffy's excitement turns into panic and he runs from the giant Elmer just as Bugs reaches the top. As Elmer closes in on the duo, Bugs reminds Elmer that he is supposed to go after Jack instead of a rabbit and claims that Daffy is Jack. Daffy frantically tries to pass this off as a lie, declaring his name to be Aloysius, and that Bugs is Jack. As the two start to argue about who the real Jack is, Elmer decides to "open up with a pair of Jacks" and captures both of them. Inside the castle, Elmer places Bugs and Daffy under a glass cake dome and prepares to grind their bones with a peppercorn grinder to make his bread. However, they manage to escape because Bugs has an ACME glass cutter in his possession. Elmer then chases the two around his castle as they are trying to escape.

The chase continues until Bugs manages to trip Elmer, knocking him unconscious. Bugs wants to leave the place, but greedy Daffy decides to stay so he can steal "those solid gold goodies" from the giant ("On account of I am greedy"). As Bugs runs towards the beanstalk, he comes across Elmer's huge carrot garden, with carrots as big as houses and ready to be eaten. Later that night, Bugs, his stomach now full and fat to a length equal to his ears, rests under one of the giant carrots he has been eating, and wonders what has become of Daffy, who is revealed to be trapped inside Elmer's pocket watch, acting like the minute and hour hands, while constantly making tick-tock sounds. Daffy remarks "Eh...it's a living", closing the cartoon.

Cast
Mel Blanc as Bugs Bunny and Daffy Duck
Arthur Q. Bryan as Elmer Fudd (uncredited)

Home media
This cartoon is available on the laserdisc release Hare Beyond Compare and on the VHS cassette Daffy Duck: The Nuttiness Continues.... As of 2020, this short is still unavailable on DVD or Blu-ray. It's been rumored that the original negative stored in WB's vaults is damaged, but it's been reported as of July 2020 that a restoration was being worked on it.

See also
List of American films of 1955

References

External links

1955 films
1955 animated films
1955 short films
Merrie Melodies short films
Warner Bros. Cartoons animated short films
Short films directed by Chuck Jones
Films based on Jack and the Beanstalk
Bugs Bunny films
Daffy Duck films
Elmer Fudd films
Films scored by Carl Stalling
Films set in castles
Films with screenplays by Michael Maltese
American parody films
Fairy tale parody films
1950s Warner Bros. animated short films
1950s English-language films
1950s American animated films